Tetraoxygen difluoride is an inorganic chemical compound of oxygen, belonging to the family of oxygen fluorides. It consists of two O2F units bound together with a weak O-O bond, and is the dimer of the O2F radical.

Preparation 
Tetraoxygen difluoride can be prepared in two steps. In the first step, a photochemically generated fluorine atom reacts with oxygen to form the dioxygen fluoride radical.

 

This radical subsequently undergoes dimerization, entering an equilibrium with tetraoxygen difluoride at temperatures under −175 °C:

 

At the same time, the dioxygen fluoride radicals decompose into dioxygen difluoride and oxygen gas, which shifts the above equilibrium with O4F2 to the left.

Properties 
Tetraoxygen difluoride is dark red-brown as a solid and has a melting point around −191 °C.

It is a strong fluorinating and oxidizing agent, even stronger than dioxygen difluoride, so that it can, for example, oxidize Ag(II) to Ag(III) or Au(III) to Au(V). This process creates the corresponding anions AgF and AuF. With non-noble substances this oxidation can lead to explosions even at low temperatures. As an example, elemental sulfur reacts explosively to form sulfur hexafluoride even at −180 °C.

Similar to [O2F]• or O2F2, tetraoxygen difluoride tends to form salts with the oxygenyl cation O when it reacts with fluoride acceptors such as boron trifluoride (BF3). In the case of BF3, this leads to the formation of O2+•BF4−:

 O4F2 + 2BF3 -> 2O2+BF4−

Similarly, for arsenic pentafluoride it reacts to create O2+AsF6−.

References 

Fluorine compounds
Oxygen compounds